Marinobacter flavimaris is a Gram-negative, non-spore-forming, slightly halophilic and motile bacterium from the genus of Marinobacter which has been isolated from sea water from the Yellow Sea in Korea.

References

Further reading

External links
Type strain of Marinobacter flavimaris at BacDive -  the Bacterial Diversity Metadatabase

Alteromonadales
Bacteria described in 2004
Halophiles